The Gambia is a very small and narrow African country with the border based on the Gambia River. The country's present boundaries were defined in 1889 after an agreement between the United Kingdom and France. It is often claimed by Gambians that the distance of the borders from the Gambia River corresponds to the area that British naval cannon of the time could reach from the river's channel. However, there is no historical evidence to support the story, and the border was actually delineated using careful surveying methods by the Franco-British boundary commission. The Gambia is almost an enclave of Senegal and is the smallest country on mainland Africa.

Terrain
The grassy flood plain of the Gambia river contains Guinean mangroves near the coast, and becomes West Sudanian savanna upriver inland.

Statistics

Location:
Western Africa, bordering the North Atlantic Ocean and Senegal

Geographic coordinates: 

Area:
total: 11,295 km²
land: 10,000 km²
water: 1,295 km²
 comparative: slightly less than Jamaica; slightly less than twice the size of Delaware

Land boundaries:
total: 749 km
border countries: Senegal 749 km

Coastline: 80 km

Maritime claims:
territorial sea: 
contiguous zone: 
exclusive fishing zone: 
continental shelf: extent not specified

Climate: tropical; hot, rainy season (June to November); cooler, dry season (November to May)

Terrain: floodplain of the Gambia River, flanked by low hills

Elevation extremes:
 lowest point: Atlantic Ocean 0 m
 highest point: at least 53 m according to The World Factbook and a 1966 map by U.S. National Imagery and Mapping Agency, 64 m based on SRTM data calculated by peakbagger.com between Sabi and the Senegalese village Vélingara, located in a sandstone plateau at the border with Senegal

Natural resources: fish, clay, silica sand, titanium (rutile and ilmenite), tin, zircon

Land use:
arable land: 43.48%
permanent crops: 0.49%
other: 56.03% (2011)
 Irrigated land: 50 km² (2011)
 Total renewable water resources: 8 km3 (2011)
 Freshwater withdrawal (domestic/industrial/agricultural):total: 0.09 km3/yr (41%/21%/39%) per capita: 65.77 m3/yr (2005)

Current issues: deforestation, desertification, prevalence of water-borne diseases, drought (rainfall has dropped by 30% in the last 30 years)

Environment - party to international agreements on:
 biodiversity, climate change, Kyoto Protocol, desertification, endangered species, hazardous wastes, law of the sea, ozone layer protection, ship pollution, wetland, whaling

Extreme points 

This is a list of the extreme points of the Gambia, the points that are farther north, south, east or west than any other location.

 Northernmost point – unnamed location on the border with Senegal immediately south of the Senegalese village of Keur Mali Makham, Central River Division
 Easternmost point – unnamed point on the border with Senegal near the village of Sembagne, Upper River Division
 Southernmost point – the point at which the border with Senegal enters the Atlantic Ocean at the mouth of the Allahein River, Western Division
 Westernmost point -  Bijol Islands, Western Division
 Westernmost point (mainland) - Solifor Point, Western Division

Gallery

See also
The Gambia
Districts of the Gambia
Farasuto Forest Community Nature Reserve, the Gambia

References

Notes